The Guadalupe River Trail is an  pedestrian and bicycle path in the city of San Jose, California.  The path runs along the banks of the Guadalupe River.  The trail is currently composed of two discontinuous segments: a short segment along the Upper Guadalupe River and a longer segment along the Lower Guadalupe River.  This trail is heavily used for both recreation and commuting, as it provides direct access to Downtown San Jose from many of the outlying neighborhoods. The trail is paved.

The Guadalupe River Trail was designated part of the National Recreation Trail system in 2009.

Route

Lower Guadalupe River 
It is discontinuous with the rest of the trail.

The southern terminus is adjacent to Almaden Lake Park at Coleman Road in the Almaden Valley neighborhood.  It runs along the river northward, with an under-crossing beneath Blossom Hill Road and passes beneath the highway fly-overs of State Route 85, ending at Chynoweth Avenue near William H. Cilker Park. It passes very close to Westfield Oakridge Mall.

Upper Guadalupe River 

The trail resumes just south of Interstate 280 at West Virginia Street (next to SR87).  The trail then follows the river northward, passing beneath Woz Way, West San Carlos Street, Park Avenue, San Fernando Street, and Santa Clara Street in Downtown San Jose.  Further north, there are roadway crossings at St. John Street and Julian Avenue.  This section of the trail passes through several city parks, including Children's Discovery Park, McEnry Park, and the Arena Green.  It also runs directly adjacent to the SAP Center.

The trail continues northward crossing Coleman Avenue, Taylor Street, Hedding Street, and Interstate 880. On this segment, the trail passes through the Guadalupe River Park and Gardens, an immense complex of parks and gardens that covers an area west of State Route 87.

The trail continues along the border of Mineta San Jose International Airport, crosses beneath Airport Parkway, U.S. Route 101, Trimble Drive, Montague Expressway, Tasman Drive, and State Route 237. This is the newest segment of the trail, which was officially opened on April 20, 2013. This section of the trail passes alongside Levi's Stadium and the Ulistac Natural Area, and connects with the Highway 237 Bikeway.

The trail's northern terminus is at Gold Street in the Alviso neighborhood.

See also 

 San Jose Trail Network Website
 Nearby Hiking Trails in Santa Clara County - San Jose Wiki

References 

Bike paths in San Jose, California
Parks in San Jose, California
Trails in the San Francisco Bay Area
National Recreation Trails in California